RMS Rangitata was an ocean passenger liner that was built in Scotland in 1929 and scrapped in Yugoslavia in 1962.

She also served as a troopship, for example in Convoy US1 taking New Zealand troops to the Middle East in January 1940. She had returned to civilian service by 1949.

References

External links
RMS Rangitata
New Zealand Shipping Company: ship information

Passenger ships of the United Kingdom
Ships of the New Zealand Shipping Company
World War II merchant ships of the United Kingdom
Ships built on the River Clyde
1929 ships
Troop ships of the United Kingdom